The Journal of Geography is an American academic journal published by the National Council for Geographic Education. The journal "publishes research, instructional approaches and book reviews on innovative approaches to geography research, teaching, and learning."

The editor in chief,  is Meredith Marsh  of  Lindenwood University, USA  It has an Impact factor of 1.262 for 2019

References

Geography journals
Publications established in 1902